Video Stock Market is a video game published by Computer Adversary Publishing.

Gameplay
Video Stock Market is a game in which stock market trading is simulated in an investment strategy game.

Reception
Jasper Sylvester reviewed the game for Computer Gaming World, and stated that "It's a quick (averages 1 and 1/2 hr.) and easy game, useful as a light and friendly evening among other "beer and pretzel" games."

References

Business simulation games